The 1919 South American Championship Final was the final match to determine the winner of the 1919 South American Championship, the third edition of this continental competition. It was held on May 29, 1919, in Estádio das Laranjeiras of Rio de Janeiro. 

Brazil won the match against Uruguay 1–0 after two extra time periods of two 15-minute halves each. This meant the match lasted 150 minutes, the longest in the tournament's history, while Brazil won its first continental title.

Qualified teams

Route to the final 

Notes
 Brazil and Uruguay finished tied on points so a playoff match had to be played to decide a champion.

Overview 
The 1919 Final was the first final to be played not only in a South American competition, but in any international football competition. The tournament system consisted of a single round-robin tournament, where the team with most points was crowned champion: however, Brazil and Uruguay finished tied on points, meaning a final was required.

It was also the first time that a non-CONMEBOL referee (Robert L. Todd of England) was appointed to a CONMEBOL match.

After the match finished 0–0, both captains and Todd agreed to play an extra time period of two 15-minute halves. When 120 minutes expired with the score still tied 0-0, both captains and Todd agreed to play a second extra time period of two 15-minute halves, meaning the final lasted 150 minutes. 

The 1919 Final is the longest football match ever in Copa América history, while Arthur Friedenreich scored the goal that allowed Brazil to win its first international title in the 122nd minute, the latest goal in Copa América history; under current rules, both records will stand indefintely.

Match details

Aftermath 

Friedenreich's goal had a huge impact in Brazil due to the fact that him was the first black men to have played football in that country. He was also the first black to be called for the national team. Although only better-off sectors in Brazilian society could play football by then, the Federation allowed Friedenreich to play due to his father was a German-native, who had played in SC Germânia, a Paulist club established by German immigrants.

Friedenreich was not only the first black men to play football in Brazil, he is considered the first black superstar of the sport, with more than 1,200 goals credited to him within 25 years of career.

After this victory, racism in Brazilian football started to drop, with several clubs including black people in their squads and even the national team. The championship also contributed to increase the popularity of the sport in the country.

Nevertheless, President of Brazil, Epitácio Pessoa, banned black players from the national team so Friedenreich could not attend the 1920 and 1921 editions in Chile and Argentina respectively. After the failures in those tournaments and popular pressure, Pessoa had to lift the ban and Friedenreich (considered the best Brazilian player) could return to the team. Brazil could win its second South American title in 1922 although Friedenreich can only play two matches before being injured.

References

1919 South American Championship
Brazil national football team matches
Uruguay national football team matches
Copa América finals
International sports competitions in Rio de Janeiro (city)
Brazil–Uruguay football rivalry
May 1919 sports events